Warrenstown is a barony in County Offaly (formerly King's County), Republic of Ireland.

Etymology
Warrenstown takes its name from Ballybrittain Castle, also called Warrenstown Castle, located east of Rhode, a tower house held by the Warren family from 1600.

Location

Warrenstown barony is in northeast County Offaly, west of the Boyne. The Yellow River flows through it.

History
Warrenstown is roughly formed from the tuath Tuath Muighe Cloinne Cholgain, indicating a relationship to the Ó hAonghusa (O'Hennessy) and Ó hUallacháin (O'Houlihan). The Crích na Cétach (O'Fallon) and the Clann Máel Chéin are noted people early to this area. Tuath Muighe (aka Tuath dá Maige, or Tethmoy) was an ancient district which comprised the modern baronies of Warrenstown and the northern part of Coolestown. The Berminghams were early Anglo-Norman grantees of Tethmoy.

List of settlements

Below is a list of settlements in Warrenstown barony:
Rhode

References

Baronies of County Offaly